Serial Bad Weddings 2 is a 2019 Belgian-French comedy film directed by Philippe de Chauveron. It is the second installment in the Serial (Bad) Weddings film series and a sequel to 2014 film of the same name, it follows the Verneuil family, an upper-class French Catholic couple portrayed by Christian Clavier and Chantal Lauby from a French province and their four daughters, three who married men of different faiths and one who married outside their race.

The film was the highest grossing French production in France in 2019 and the third highest-grossing film of 2019 in France. A third installment, Serial (Bad) Weddings 3, is set to be released in April 2022.

Release
Serial (Bad) Weddings 2 was released in France and Belgium on January 30, 2019. The film grossed over 45 million Euros from 7 million admissions in France which made it break a four-year record for a local language film. The film received a theatrical release in several countries, including Germany, Switzerland and Canada. A third film in the series has been planned.

As of December 1, 2019, the film was in third place on the 2019 chart having attracted 6.7 million admissions, for a box office of $47.7m making it the third highest-grossing film in France in 2019 and the highest grossing French production in 2019. Melanie Goodfellow noted that "In spite of this stellar performance, the box office was 45% lower than for the original 2014 Serial Bad Weddings, which drew a mighty 12.4 million spectators ($91m).

Reception
Jordan Mintzer of The Hollywood Reporter stated that the film "feels like a slight improvement on the first movie, delivering a few mild laughs amid a similar onslaught of overwrought gags, over-the-top performances and “can’t we all just get along?” messaging meant to lure Frenchies into theaters so they can chortle at their own cultural differences — if not at their countrymen's latent racism." The review concluded that "What may ultimately be most offensive about these movies is not what they’re trying to say, but how they say it."

References

External links
 

2019 comedy films
2019 films
French comedy films
Films set in France
Belgian comedy films
2010s French-language films
French-language Belgian films
Films directed by Philippe de Chauveron
2010s French films